The following is a list of state highways in the U.S. state of New Jersey.

See also

County routes in New Jersey

References

External links

New Jersey Department of Transportation
Unofficial New Jersey route log

State